James Duckworth and Pierre-Hugues Herbert were the defending champions, but decided not to compete.

Máximo González and Eduardo Schwank won the title, defeating André Sá and João Souza in the final, 6–2, 6–3.

Seeds

  André Sá /  João Souza (final)
  Máximo González /  Eduardo Schwank (champions)
  Diego Sebastián Schwartzman /  Horacio Zeballos (first round)
  Guillermo Durán /  Renzo Olivo (semifinals)

Draw

Draw

References
 Main Draw

Taroii Open de Tenis - Doubles
2013 Doubles